A capstone course, also known as a synthesis and capstone project, senior synthesis, capstone unit, synthesis seminar, synthesis project, capstone module, capstone project, capstone subject, capstone and research project, synthesis and research project, a capstone experience, or a senior seminar serves as the culminating and usually integrative praxis experience of an educational program mostly found in American-style pedagogy. Although somewhat different form an industry-oriented capstone project, case study, case method, or praxis commonly used in American-style higher education; in the   Commonwealth of Nations, Bologna Process, and in other parts of the world influenced by their education systems, a senior thesis (thesis) usually takes its place as a culmination of an educational program but is much more theoretical and academia-oriented rather than the praxis and industry-oriented synthesis and capstone project.  

Some universities and colleges award a Capstone Award or Capstone Prize based on merit in the capstone course.

The term derives from the final decorative coping or "cap-stone" used to complete a building or monument. In higher education, the term has been in common use in the USA since the mid-twentieth century, although there is evidence that it was in use as early as the late 1800s. It has gradually been gaining currency in other countries, particularly where attention has focused on student outcomes and employability in undergraduate studies. National grant projects in Australia and the U.K. have further raised the profile of the capstone experience.

See also
Major (academic)
Seminar
Thesis

References

Educational programs